TJ Slovan Viničné is a Slovak association football club located in Viničné. It currently plays in 3. liga (3rd tier in Slovak football system). The club was founded in 1939.

Colors and badge 
Its colors are blue and white.

References

External links
 Futbalnet profile 
 Club profile 
 

Football clubs in Slovakia
1939 establishments in Slovakia